Sapa Arena is an indoor bandy and ice hockey rink in Vetlanda in Sweden. It is the home venue of Vetlanda BK, and was inaugurated on 10 September 2011 with a men's friendly bandy game where Vetlanda BK defeated Hammarby IF, 5–3. Sapa Arena holds 2,000 people. It hosted Division B of the 2013 Bandy World Championship.

References

Bandy venues in Sweden
Sport in Vetlanda
Sports venues completed in 2011
2011 establishments in Sweden